Mulga Fred Wilson (1874 – 2 November 1948)  was an Aboriginal Australian stockman and actor, known as Mulga Fred.

He appeared in the film Bushranger's Ransom, or A Ride for Life (1911) making him arguably the first Aboriginal Australian to appear in a motion picture.

Biography
He was born north of Marble Bar and became a champion stockman, often appearing in horse shows. He rode at the Coronation of King George in 1911.

He died in 1948 in a train accident.

References

1874 births
1948 deaths
Australian actors